HLA-A24 (A24) is a human leukocyte antigen serotype within HLA-A serotype group. The serotype is determined by the antibody recognition of α24 subset of HLA-A α-chains. For A24, the alpha, "A", chain are encoded by the HLA-A allele group and the β-chain are encoded by B2M locus. This group currently is dominated by A*2402.  A24 and A are almost synonymous in meaning.
A24 is a split antigen of the broad antigen HLA-A9 and it is a sister serotype of HLA-A23.

A*2402 has one of the highest "A" frequencies identified for a number of peoples, including Papua New Guineans, Indigenous Taiwanese (Eastern Tribals), Yupik and Greenland [Aleuts]. It is common over much of Southeastern Asia. In Eurasia it is least common in Ireland, and A24 is relatively uncommon in Africa except North Africa and Kenya.

Serotype

There are over 90 known A*24 alleles, 69 code for different isoforms and 7 are nulls. A*2403 can also be detected as A2403 serotype.

Associated disease
A24 has a secondary risk factor for myasthenia gravis,  Buerger's disease. It is also associated with Type 1 Diabetes (T1D) and systemic lupus erythematosus (SLE).

Alleles

A*2402 is a secondary risk factor, alters type 1 diabetes risk, and allele associated with thymoma-induced myasthenia gravis.

Haplotypes

A24-Cw7-B39
A24-Cw10-B60
A24-Cw10-B61
A24-B48

A24-Cw4-B35
This particular haplotype is common across a fairly wide region, possibly the most widely spread A-Cw-B haplotype in humans. Cw4-B35 has a node within the region once referred to as Thracia/Dacia.

A24-Cw*14-B51

References 

2